George Bouet Petersen  (5 September 1933 – 11 July 2021) was a New Zealand biochemist. He is regarded as the father of DNA research in New Zealand.

Early life and family
Born in Palmerston North on 5 September 1933, Petersen was the son of Elizabeth Stella Osberta Petersen (née Cairns) and George Conrad Petersen. He was educated at Palmerston North Boys' High School, and went on to study at the University of Otago, graduating Master of Science with second-class honours in 1956. He then undertook postgraduate study at the University of Oxford, earning Master of Arts and Doctor of Philosophy degrees.

On 16 April 1960, Petersen married Patricia Jane Egerton Caughey, and the couple went on to have four children.

Honours and awards
Petersen was elected a Fellow of the Royal Society of New Zealand in 1985. He was also a Fellow of the New Zealand Institute of Chemistry. In the 1997 New Year Honours, he was appointed an Officer of the New Zealand Order of Merit, for services to the community. In 2003, Petersen received the Rutherford Medal, the most prestigious award given by the Royal Society of New Zealand.

References

1933 births
2021 deaths
People from Palmerston North
New Zealand biochemists
Academic staff of the University of Otago
Fellows of the Royal Society of New Zealand
Officers of the New Zealand Order of Merit
People educated at Palmerston North Boys' High School
University of Otago alumni
Alumni of the University of Oxford
Fellows of the New Zealand Institute of Chemistry